Shri Dharam Pal Sabharwal a politician from Indian National Congress party is a Member of the Parliament of India representing Punjab in the Rajya Sabha, the upper house of the Indian Parliament.

External links
 Profile on Rajya Sabha website

Bharatiya Janata Party politicians from Punjab
Rajya Sabha members from Punjab, India
Living people
Year of birth missing (living people)
Place of birth missing (living people)
Indian National Congress politicians from Punjab, India